All They Ever Wanted is the second album released by the Swedish rock group Johnossi. It includes the singles "Party With My Pain", "18 Karat Gold" and "Bobby".

Track listing
All tracks composed by John Engelbert.
 "18 Karat Gold" - 4:42
 "Party with My Pain" - 3:37
 "Send More Money" - 3:06
 "Train Song" - 3:09
 "In the Mystery Time of Cold and Rain" - 3:22
 "Zeppelin" - 4:00
 "Bobby" - 4:09
 "All They Ever Wanted" - 2:31
 "Up in the Air" - 3:20
 "Lie Lie Die" - 5:04
 "Break Into School (Late At Night)" - 4:02 (iTunes bonus track)

Personnel 
Oskar "Ossi" Bonde – percussion, drums, group member
John Engelbert – guitar, vocals, group member
Jari Haapalainen – producer
Henrik Jonsson – mastering
Markus Krunegård – backing vocals
Mathias Olden – mixing

References

2008 albums
Johnossi albums